Alexander Khrokin(born 10 July 1976) is a former Russian rugby union footballer. He played as a prop.

He played is entire career at VVA-Podmoskovye Monino, from 1994/95 to 2012/13.

He had 77 caps for Russia, from 1994 to 2011, scoring 7 tries, 35 points on aggregate. Khrokin was part of the Russian squad at the 2011 Rugby World Cup, playing in two games but without scoring.

References

External links

2011 Rugby World Cup Profile

1976 births
Living people
Russian rugby union players
Russia international rugby union players
Sportspeople from Moscow
Rugby union props